This is a collection of Australian rugby league grand final records as of the end of the 2022 season.

Premierships by team

Premiership frequency

Premiership droughts

Current club premiership droughts

Biggest winning margin

Most points scored by a team

Highest scoring grand finals

Lowest scoring grand finals

Notes
Newtown were declared premiers due to their Minor Premiership in 1910
The 1910 and 1986 Grand Finals have been the only tryless Grand Finals to date.

Most grand final appearances by a player

Most grand finals hosted by a venue

Highest attended grand finals

Most grand finals refereed

See also

References

External links

National Rugby League lists
Grand final records
Records
Rugby league records and statistics
Rugby league grand final